Kwong Tai Middle School or Guang Da Middle School is a private school in Macau, serving preschool through secondary school. It has a main campus in Nossa Senhora de Fátima (Our Lady of Fatima Parish) and a branch campus in Santo António (Saint Anthony's Parish).

References

External links

 Kwong Tai Middle School 

Schools in Macau
Macau Peninsula